Robert Scott (December 10, 1892 – November 22, 1947) was a Negro leagues outfielder from 1919 to 1927, playing mostly for the St. Louis Giants and the Brooklyn Royal Giants.

References

External links
 and Baseball-Reference Black Baseball stats and Seamheads

1892 births
1947 deaths
Brooklyn Royal Giants players
Hilldale Club players
Lincoln Giants players
St. Louis Giants players
Sportspeople from Galveston, Texas
20th-century African-American sportspeople
Burials at Long Island National Cemetery
Harrisburg Giants players